At the 2019 European Games in Minsk, matches across fifteen weight categories in boxing were contested between 21 and 30 June 2019, of which ten were allocated to men and five were allocated to women.

In contrast to 2015, this tournament doubled up as the 2019 European Amateur Boxing Championships for men. For women, it remained a separate tournament.

Qualification

There was a nominal allocation of 316 athlete quota places (256 men, 60 women) for boxing at the 2019 European Games.

For the men's tournament, each National Olympic Committee (NOC) could simply enter one athlete per category. For the women's tournament, qualification was limited to one athlete per category and determined by (in the following order):
 AIBA World Ranking list as of December 2018
 2018 Women's European Amateur Boxing Championships placings (for unranked competitors)
 2018 AIBA Women's World Boxing Championships placings (for unranked competitors not involved in the European Championships)

As the host NOC, Belarus was guaranteed athlete quota places for all fifteen categories. Five places (one per women's category) were reserved for universality allocations.

Competition schedule
There were generally two sessions per day for the majority of the tournament - an afternoon session (A), starting at 14:00 FET; then an evening session (E), starting at 18:30 FET. The last two days had one session each, beginning at 16:00 & 12:00 FET respectively.

Boxers also had a rest day during the competition.

Medalists

Men

Women

Medal tables

Overall

Men's European Championships (European Amateur Boxing Championships)

Participating nations
A total of 317 athletes from 44 nations competed in boxing at the 2019 European Games:

References

External links
EUBC
Results book

 
Sports at the 2019 European Games
2019
European Games
2019
European Games